Jakub Józef Kopf or Kopowski (March 13, 1915 in Kraków – June 2, 1983 in Kraków) was a Polish basketball player who competed in the 1936 Summer Olympics.

He was part of the Polish basketball team, which finished fourth in the Olympic tournament. He played in two matches.

References

External links
profile

1915 births
1983 deaths
Polish men's basketball players
Olympic basketball players of Poland
Basketball players at the 1936 Summer Olympics
Sportspeople from Kraków